The Cultural Heritage of Andorra is an organization in Andorra which protects national buildings and monuments considered of cultural and historical value.

Selected buildings listed

Antiga fàbrica de pells
Antiga Vegueria Francesa
Cal Batlle
Cal Pal
Cal Ribot
Casa Balletbó
Casa Blanca, Ordino
Casa Bonet
Casa Cristo
Casa d'Areny-Plandolit
Casa de la Vall
Casa del Quart d'Anyós
Casa dels Russos
Casa Duró
Casa Felipó
Casa Lacruz
Casa Massip-Dolsa
Casa Palmitjavila
Casa Rossell
Casa Vidal
Casa Xurrina
Castell de les Bons
Central hidroelèctrica de FHASA a Encamp
Colomer de Cotxa
Col·legi Sagrada Família, Escaldes-Engordany
Església de Sant Andreu d'Arinsal
Església de Sant Bartomeu de Soldeu
Església de Sant Climent de Pal
Església de Sant Corneli i Sant Cebrià d'Ordino
Església de Sant Cristòfol d'Anyós
Església de Sant Esteve de Bixessarri
Església de Sant Esteve
Església de Sant Iscle i Santa Victòria (Andorra)
Església de Sant Joan de Caselles
Església de Sant Joan de Sispony
Església de Sant Julià i Sant Germà
Església de Sant Martí de la Cortinada
Església de Sant Martí de Nagol
Església de Sant Miquel d'Engolasters
Església de Sant Miquel de Fontaneda
Església de Sant Miquel de la Mosquera
Església de Sant Miquel de Prats
Església de Sant Pere d'Aixirivall
Església de Sant Pere del Serrat
Església de Sant Pere del Tarter
Església de Sant Pere Màrtir, Escaldes-Engordany
Església de Sant Romà de les Bons
Església de Sant Romà dels Vilars
Església de Sant Serni de Canillo
Església de Sant Serni de Llorts
Església de Sant Serni de Nagol
Església de Santa Bàrbara d'Ordino
Església de Santa Coloma d'Andorra
Església de Santa Creu de Canilló
Emissora de Sud-Ràdio
Escoles d'Andorra la Vella
Escoles d'Ordino
Escoles de la Massana
Farga Rossell
Font de l'Avinguda de les Escoles
Font de la plaça Creu Blanca
Font de la plaça Santa Anna
Galeries Cristall
Garatge i cinema Valira
Hostal Palanques
Hotel Bellavista
Hotel Carlemany
Hotel Casamanya
Hotel Rosaleda
Hotel Valira
Mare de Déu de Canòlic
Museu Casa Rull
Pont d'Anyós
Pont d'Engordany
Pont de la Margineda
Pont de la Tosca
Pont de Sassanat
Pont dels Escalls
Pont Pla
Presa d'Engolasters
Presa i caseta del guarda de Ràmio
Quart de Sispony
Ràdio Andorra
Santuari nou de Meritxell
Terminal del funicular d'Engolasters i casa del guarda

External links

Official site

 
Andorra-related lists
Heritage of Andorra
Andorra